The 1920 Wimbledon Championships took place on the outdoor grass courts at the All England Lawn Tennis and Croquet Club in Wimbledon, London, United Kingdom. The tournament ran from 21 June until 3 July. It was the 40th staging of the Wimbledon Championships, and the second Grand Slam tennis event of 1920.

Champions

Men's singles

 Bill Tilden defeated  Gerald Patterson 2–6, 6–3, 6–2, 6–4

Women's singles

 Suzanne Lenglen defeated  Dorothea Lambert Chambers 6–3, 6–0

Men's doubles

 Chuck Garland /  R. Norris Williams defeated  Algernon Kingscote /  James Cecil Parke 4–6, 6–4, 7–5, 6–2

Women's doubles

 Suzanne Lenglen /  Elizabeth Ryan defeated  Dorothea Lambert Chambers /  Ethel Larcombe 6–4, 6–0

Mixed doubles

 Gerald Patterson /  Suzanne Lenglen defeated  Randolph Lycett /  Elizabeth Ryan 7–5, 6–3

References

External links
 Official Wimbledon Championships website

 
Wimbledon Championships
Wimbledon Championships
Wimbledon Championships
Wimbledon Championships